Eroski is a Spanish supermarket chain with nearly 1,000 outlets spread across Spain (excluding franchises).
It is run as a worker-consumer hybrid co-operative within the Mondragón Corporation group.
The establishments vary in size from the largest hypermarkets, simply named 'Eroski' (of which there are 75 stores, including 40 with petrol stations), down to smaller 'Eroski Center' stores (473, including 2 petrol stations). There are also 219 'Eroski City' outlets and 234 'Eroski Viajes' travel agent centres. The name Eroski is a combination of the Basque words "erosi" (to buy) and "toki" (place).

History
The company was founded in 1969 in the regions of Biscay and Gipuzkoa in Spain as a co-operative between ten supermarkets in the region. Its headquarters are located in Elorrio, Biscay.

Franchises

Aliprox supermarkets are not owned by Eroski, despite having a similar logo. Instead, Aliprox is the brand for franchises. These outlets are independently owned, but still maintain the same product ranges, sales policies and general standard expected throughout the company. There are presently 553 franchised outlets.

Finances
As of mid-2016, Eroski's operating income is 45% higher than in the first semester of the 2015 and kept improving up to 54 million Euros

Eroski has 442 new generation shops, 23 hypermarkets and 419 supermarkets, growing by 7% in sales on average
Turnover keeps stable at 2,965 million Euros
Investments reach 45 million Euros, mainly aimed at shop refurbishment and information systems
It reduced its financial debt by 169 million Euros during the first six months of the year
Between February and July this year, EROSKI generated 625 new jobs in its owned and franchised shops
The parent cooperative EROSKI S. Coop. reached a profit of 8.8 million Euros

Staff
In 2004, staff numbers exceeded 30,000 for the first time.
Nearly 7,000 new positions have been created in the last four years.

Growth

Brand
These names replace the former hierarchy of 'Eroski', 'Maxi', 'Consum' and 'Charter', the latter of which was the name reserved for smaller franchise stores. This rebranding took place during the course of 2003-2004 in an effort to re-focus the company as the many different names confused customers. Indeed, regardless of the name over the door, customers inevitably referred to the shops as 'Eroski', not Maxi or Charter. Under the new name, consumers are referring to the company correctly.

By country

Spain
In 2007, Eroski purchased Caprabo, adding around 500 supermarkets to the chain.

France
Having taken a strong grip over the Spanish mainland, especially in the Basque Country from where the company originates. It is now expanding into France. They have three hypermarkets, eighteen supermarkets and seven petrol stations in the country at this time.

Alongside this, they also own the Forum Sport store chain, 172 perfume shops and six cash and carry outlets.

A merger with the Valencia-based co-operative Consum lasted only a few years.
In 2005, each went their own way.

Figures correct as of July 2005.

United Kingdom
As of 2022, Eroski has four stores in Gibraltar.

See also
Supermarkets in Spain

References

External links

Eroski Group Website (Spanish, Catalan, Basque and Galician)
Consumer Eroski magazine.

Supermarkets of Spain
Supermarkets
Food retailers
Distribution (marketing)
Mondragon Corporation
Retail companies established in 1969
Spanish companies established in 1969
Companies established in 1969
1969 in Spain
Biscay
Basque companies